The northern pygmy mouse (Baiomys taylori) is a species of rodent in the family Cricetidae.  It is known as ratón-pigmeo norteño in the Spanish-speaking areas of its range. It is found in Mexico and the United States.

Parasites of the northern pygmy mouse include the intestinal nematode Pterygodermatites baiomydis.

Reproduction
The pygmy mouse has litters of 1 to 5 pups, with an average of 3.  The gestation time for pregnant females is less than 20 days.  Unlike many other rodents, father pygmy mice will care for offspring, and groom and huddle over young.

Communication
In captivity, these mice will sometimes produce a 'squeal', and use a posture similar to singing mice.

References

Baiomys
mammals described in 1887
Taxa named by Oldfield Thomas
mammals of Mexico
mammals of the United States
taxonomy articles created by Polbot